William Sammes (by 1491 – 1542 or later), of Lincoln, was an English politician.

Sammes was Mayor of Lincoln in 1515–16. He was a Member (MP) of the Parliament of England for Lincoln in 1529.

References

15th-century births
16th-century deaths
Members of the Parliament of England (pre-1707) for Lincoln
Mayors of Lincoln, England
English MPs 1529–1536